Muskogee County is a county located in the U.S. state of Oklahoma. As of the 2010 census, the population was 70,990.  The county seat is Muskogee. The county and city were named for the Muscogee (Creek) Nation. The official spelling of the name was changed to Muskogee by the post office in 1900.

Muskogee County is part of the Muskogee, OK Micropolitan Statistical Area, which is included in the Tulsa-Muskogee-Bartlesville Combined Statistical Area.

History
According to archaeological studies, prehistoric people lived in this area as long ago as the Paleo-Indian period (before 6,000 B. C.). However, archaeologists have made more extensive studies of those people known as the Mound Builders who lived here during the Caddoan Stage (A.D. 300 – 1200).

One of the first Europeans to come to this area was Jean Baptiste Bénard de la Harpe. He was a French explorer and trader who discovered a Wichita village in 1719.  By the end of the 18th century the Wichita had been driven away by the more warlike Osage, who used this as their hunting ground. Auguste Pierre Chouteau and other fur traders had established a settlement at the Three Forks. Early in the 19th Century, Cherokee and Choctaw hunting parties made incursions that caused frequent conflict with the Osage. In 1824, the U.S. Army established Fort Gibson on the Grand River to dampen the conflict. The town of Fort Gibson that grew up just outside the fort claims to be the oldest town in Oklahoma.

At the start of the U. S. Civil War, Confederate troops of the Cherokee and Creek Home Guards built Fort Davis, across the Arkansas River from Fort Gibson. Federal troops attacked and destroyed Fort Davis in 1862, driving the Confederates from this area, although a few skirmishes occurred later in the war at Bayou Menard Skirmish (1862), several at Webbers Falls (1862), and the Creek Agency Skirmish (1863).

The county was formed at statehood with land from the Muskogee District of the Creek Nation and the Canadian and Illinois Districts of the Cherokee Nation. A post office named Muscogee had been established January 17, 1872. The official spelling of the name was changed to Muskogee on July 19, 1900.

After the Civil War, the Five Civilized Tribes, which included the Creeks, agreed to new treaties with the federal government. Among other provisions, they ceded their western lands back to the government and allowed rights of way to railroads. The Missouri, Kansas and Texas Railway (also called MKT or Katy) built a line into Indian Territory, near the Three Forks. Although railroad officials intended to build a depot at the site of Fort Davis, the terrain proved unsuitable, so they relocated the depot, which they named Muscogee, farther south. They also began the town of Oktaha  farther south, in the same year.

Other railroads followed, such as the Kansas and Arkansas Valley Railway (1888, later the Missouri Pacific Railway), the Midland Valley Railroad (1904–05), the Ozark and Cherokee Central Railway (1901–03, sold to the St. Louis and San Francisco Railway, Frisco), the Shawnee, Oklahoma and Missouri Coal and Railway (1902–03, sold to the Frisco), the Muskogee Union Railway (1903–04, sold to the Missouri, Oklahoma and Gulf Railway [MOG]), and the MOG (1903–05, which became the Texas and Pacific Railroad).

In 1874, the federal government consolidated all of the Five Civilized Tribes agencies into one Union Agency, located just west of Muscogee. In 1889, a federal district court was created in Muscogee. In 1894, the Dawes Commission also established its headquarters there.

Geography

The western part of the county is prairie grassland, while the eastern part rises into the Cookson Hills, on the western edge of the Ozark Mountains. The Arkansas, Verdigris and Grand rivers all converge in the county, causing that area to be called "Three Forks." Webbers Falls Lake on the Arkansas River covers part of the county.

Major highways

  Interstate 40
  U.S. Highway 62
  U.S. Highway 64
  U.S. Highway 69
  State Highway 2
  State Highway 10
  State Highway 16
  State Highway 72
  Muskogee Turnpike

Adjacent counties
 Wagoner County (north)
 Cherokee County (northeast)
 Sequoyah County (east)
 Haskell County (southeast)
 McIntosh County (southwest)
 Okmulgee County (west)

National protected area
 Sequoyah National Wildlife Refuge (part)

Government
The county seat of the county is Muskogee. All elected officials and county services are headquartered there.

Demographics

As of the 2010 United States Census, there were 70,990 people living in the county. 59.8% were White, 17.5% Native American, 11.3% Black or African American, 0.6% Asian, 2.6% of some other race and 8.2% of two or more races. 5.2% were Hispanic or Latino (of any race). 16.7% were of American, 8.2% German and 7.3% Irish ancestry.

As of the census of 2000, there were 69,451 people, 26,458 households, and 18,467 families living in the county.  The population density was 33/km2 (85/mi2).  There were 29,575 housing units at an average density of 14/km2 (36/mi2).  The racial makeup of the county was 63.73% White, 13.16% Black or African American, 14.88% Native American, 0.58% Asian, 0.03% Pacific Islander, 1.19% other races, and 6.43% from two or more races.  2.67% of the population were Hispanic or Latino of any race.

There were 26,458 households, of which 31.80% had children under the age of 18 living with them, 52.80% were married couples living together, 13.30% had a female householder with no husband present, and 30.20% were non-families. 26.70% of all households were made up of individuals; 12.30% were someone living alone who was 65 years of age or older.  The average household size was 2.51, and the average family size was 3.03.

The age distribution of the population was 25.90% under the age of 18, 9.50% from 18 to 24, 26.70% from 25 to 44, 22.60% from 45 to 64, and 15.30% 65 or older.  The median age was 37 years. For every 100 females there were 93.30 males.  For every 100 females age 18 and over, there were 88.90 males.

The median income of households in the county was $28,438, and the median income per family was $34,793. Males had a median income of $28,670 versus $20,457 for females. The per capita income for the county was $14,828.  About 14.10% of families and 17.90% of the population were below the poverty line, including 24.00% of those under age 18 and 14.70% of those age 65 or over.

Politics
Despite the county being home to a significant Native American population and competitive in party registration, the county has not voted that way in presidential elections during the 21st century. Donald Trump beat Hillary Clinton 62%-33% in 2016, which was a sharp right-turn from the competitive totals from Barack Obama's efforts in the prior two elections. Trump went on to beat Joe Biden by an even greater margin in 2020.

In February 2022, Republicans held a plurality of registered voters in Muskogee County for the first time in recent history.

Economy
At statehood, the economy was based primarily on agriculture and ranching. The main crops in the county were corn, cotton, and wheat. Agricultural service industries consisted mainly of cotton gins, grain mills, and stockyards. Cotton production declined dramatically during the Great Depression and was replaced by soybeans, wheat, feed grains, and grasses. Truck farming became important during and after World War II, leading to the development of a canning and food-processing industry.

Other economic activities included oil, gas, and coal production, but these activities never reached the levels achieved in other regions. Sand and gravel pits, along with brick and glass manufacturing, developed and remained important employment sources. O. W. Coburn built an optical business that became one of the largest in the nation and employed hundreds of workers. Other industrialists included the Buddrus family, who began Acme Engineering, and the Rooney family who founded Manhattan Construction. State and federal employment has long been important, primarily in education and veterans' services. Light manufacturing and health care as well as social services provide jobs for residents. The town of Taft has two state correctional facilities, Dr. Eddie Warrior Correctional Center for women and Jess Dunn Correctional Center for men.

Steamboats had plied the Arkansas River throughout much of the nineteenth and early twentieth century. The McClellan-Kerr Arkansas River Navigation System, dedicated in 1971, opening the Arkansas and Verdigris rivers to year-round commercial traffic and leading to the development of the Port of Muskogee.

Education
Education was a high priority after the Civil War, with schools started by churches, private individuals, and the Cherokee and Creek nations. Higher educational opportunities were offered after 1880 when Bacone College, Oklahoma's oldest, began as Indian University in Tahlequah, but was moved to the Creek Nation in present Muskogee County in 1885. Evangel Mission, a school at Union Agency for Creek freedmen, operated in the 1880s and now houses the Five Civilized Tribes Museum in Muskogee. A facility for educating visually impaired people opened at Fort Gibson in 1898. Later moved to Muskogee, it became the Oklahoma School for the Blind. Minerva Home, a school for girls in Muskogee, became Henry Kendall College in 1894, which moved to Tulsa and became the University of Tulsa in 1920. Northeastern State University opened a branch campus in Muskogee in 1994.

K-12 school districts:
 Braggs Public Schools
 Checotah Public Schools
 Fort Gibson Public Schools
 Gore Public Schools
 Haskell Public Schools
 Hilldale Public Schools
 Midway Public Schools
 Muskogee Public Schools
 Oktaha Public Schools
 Porum Public Schools
 Wainwright Public School - Elementary school only
 Warner Public Schools
 Webbers Falls Public Schools

State-operated schools:
 Oklahoma School for the Blind (Sulphur)
 Oklahoma School for the Deaf (Muskogee)

Communities

Cities
 Muskogee (county seat)

Towns

 Boynton
 Braggs
 Council Hill
 Fort Gibson
 Haskell
 Oktaha
 Porum
 Summit
 Taft
 Wainwright
 Warner
 Webbers Falls

Census-designated places
 Briartown
 Keefton
 Norwood (mostly in Cherokee County)
 River Bottom
 Sand Hill
 Simms
 Sour John

Other unincorporated place
 Pumpkin Center

Notable people
 Tom Coburn (b. 1948), lived in Muskogee; served in U. S. House of Representatives (1995-2001); served as U.S. Senator from Oklahoma (1995-2014);
 Drew Edmondson (b. 1946), was elected attorney general for Oklahoma (1995-2011); ran unsuccessfully for governor of Oklahoma in 2010 and 2018.
 Edmond Edmondson (1919-1990), served the Second Congressional District, which includes Muskogee County, from 1953 to 1973.
 James Howard Edmondson (1925-1971), born in Muskogee, served as Oklahoma governor (1959–63) and senator (1963–64).
 Charles N. Haskell (1860-1933), settled in Muskogee in 1901 and became a leader at the Sequoyah Convention and Oklahoma's first governor in 1907.
 Robert L. Owen (1856-1947), a Cherokee, served as the U.S. agent to the Five Civilized Tribes in Muskogee. In 1907 he became one of Oklahoma's first U.S. senators.
 Pleasant Porter (1840-1907), principal chief of the Creek Nation, negotiated the allotment treaty with the Dawes Commission. He served as president of the Sequoyah Convention.
 Alexander Posey (1873-1908), a Creek poet and newspaper editor in Muskogee, was secretary of the Sequoyah Convention and is credited with writing most of that constitution.
 Alice M. Robertson  (1854-1931), the first woman appointed postmaster of a Class A post office in the United States, in 1920 was elected to the U.S. House of Representatives. She was the second woman in the United States to hold a congressional seat and was the only woman to serve Oklahoma in Congress until Mary Fallin was elected in 2006.
 Belle Starr (1848-1899), American outlaw; lived in the Cookson Hills in eastern Muskogee County.
 Mike Synar (1950-1996) served in Congress from 1979 to 1995.
 Ken Doke (2015–Present) (b. 1975), born in Muskogee; Muskogee County Commissioner (2014–Present); 2019 Citation from the State of Oklahoma for efforts during historic flooding in 2019; 2021 Public Official of the Year.

NRHP sites

The following sites in Muskogee County are listed on the National Register of Historic Places:

References

 
1907 establishments in Oklahoma
Populated places established in 1907